Antakin was a Bornean mass murderer, who killed six women and nine men, three of them youths, and wounded two other women and a man in Gunsat's Kampong near Keningau, North Borneo, on May 27, 1897. According to reports Antakin, a coolie, killed his wife after finding out that she had an affair with a man named Egah, and then rushed through the street stabbing people at random with his kris, until he was shot dead by one of Gunsat's followers.

Victims

References

Mass murder in 1897
1897 deaths
Year of birth missing
Murderers of children
British North Borneo